Redington is an unincorporated community in Morrill County, Nebraska, United States.

History
A post office was established at Redington in 1886, and remained in operation until it was discontinued in 1962. The community was named for Henry V. Redington, a pioneer.

References

Unincorporated communities in Morrill County, Nebraska
Unincorporated communities in Nebraska